Guder is a town in Ethiopia.

Guder may also refer to:

Guder River, Ethiopia
Guder, Iran, a village in Kerman Province, Iran
Güder, Bayburt, a village in Bayburt Province, Turkey
Güder, Vezirköprü, a village in Samsun Province, Turkey
Darrell Guder, American theologian and professor at Princeton Theological Seminary